Rat Island is a small unpopulated granitic islet (0.01 km²) in the Seychelles, Located 600 m east of the island of Mahé, near the runway of the Seychelles International Airport. the island is 1.3 km from other neighboring Anonyme Island. 
Rat Island is almost circular in shape, its length is 88 meters, width - 93 m. It has some low growing shrubs.

Administration
The island belongs to Pointe La Rue District.

Image gallery

References

External links 

 National Bureau of Statistics
 info
 Mahe Map 2015
 Info on the island
Uninhabited islands of Seychelles
Islands of Mahé Islands